North Carolina's 2nd Senate district is one of 50 districts in the North Carolina Senate. It has been represented by Republican Jim Perry since 2023.

Geography
Since 2023, the district has included all of Lenoir, Craven, and Beaufort counties. The district overlaps with the 3rd, 12th, 13th, and 79th state house districts.

District officeholders since 1989

Election results

2022

2020

2018

2016

2014

2012

2010

2008

2006

2004

2002

2000

References

North Carolina Senate districts
Lenoir County, North Carolina
Craven County, North Carolina
Beaufort County, North Carolina